Thermofoil is a surface finish applied to cabinets by multiple manufacturers. It is a plastic material which is thermoformed to the profile of an underlying engineered wood core such as medium-density fiberboard.  Thermofoil typically has a high-quality sheen and may incorporate metallic elements in its finish (analogous to the metallic paint on an automobile).

Often used for making kitchen cabinet doors, this reasonably priced and commonly available synthetic material is a thin, tight, heat-sealed plastic wrap used to mold over an MDF substrate. Thermofoil cabinet doors can be a solid color or imitation wood grain. The cabinet boxes that accompany these doors can be finished in various materials such matching thermofoil, coordinating paint, and laminates. Thermofoil is available in a range of textures and sheen levels, the most popular choice being solid white with a matte sheen. For a budget kitchen remodel, a thermofoil cabinet door is an easy and economical alternative to white paint. 

The downside of thermofoil is its greater susceptibility to heat and moisture damage compared to other materials. Heat-generating appliances such as coffeemakers and toasters should not be placed too close to the cabinets. Heat shields can be placed between cabinets and major appliances such as dishwashers and ranges. Many appliances come with built-in shields.

References

Surface decorative techniques in woodworking